Blanchard House may refer to:

Lamar-Blanchard House, Lincolnton, Georgia, listed on the National Register of Historic Places (NRHP) in Lincoln County
Blanchard House (Boyce, Louisiana), listed on the NRHP in Rapides Parish
Ora Blanchard House, Stratton, Maine, listed on the NRHP in Franklin County
Capt. S.C. Blanchard House, Yarmouth, Maine, listed on the NRHP in Cumberland County
Blanchard-Upton House, Andover, Massachusetts, listed on the NRHP in Essex County
John C. Blanchard House, Ionia, Michigan, listed on the NRHP in Ionia County
Serna-Blanchard House, Las Vegas, New Mexico, listed on the NRHP in San Miguel County
Blanchard House (Syracuse, New York), listed on the NRHP in Onondaga County
Joshua James Blanchard House, Warsaw, North Carolina, listed on the NRHP in Duplin County